Budiša is a Croatian surname. Notable people with the surname include:

Igor Budiša (born 1977), Croatian footballer
Dražen Budiša (born 1948), Croatian politician
Nediljko Budisa (born 1966), Croatian scientist

Croatian surnames